Arctic fox (Vulpes lagopus) is an animal native to Arctic regions.

Arctic Fox may also refer to:

 Arcticfox, a first person action computer game
 Operation Arctic Fox, a joint Finnish-German offensive during World War II